The Bhutan women's national under-17 football team represents Bhutan in women's  international under-17 football. The team is controlled by the governing body for football in Bhutan, the Bhutan Football Federation. The team participate  AFC U-17 Women's Championship and SAFF U-15 Women's Championship.

History 
The Bhutan national women's under-17 football represents Bhutan in the women's U-17 level. They are the very weakest team in the South Asian Football Federation. The team have not yet qualified to the FIFA U-17 Women's World Cup and AFC U-17 Women's Championship. They are only play SAFF U-15 Women's Championship and 2018 and 2019 the team finished third position.

Current squad 
The following squad was announced for 2022 SAFF U-15 Women's Championship

Fixtures and results 
Legend

2018

2019

2022

Competitive record

FIFA U-17 Women's World Cup 

*Draws include knockout matches decided on penalty kicks.

AFC U-17 Women's Asian Cup 

*Draws include knockout matches decided on penalty kicks.

AFC U-17 Women's Asian Cup qualification 

*Draws include knockout matches decided on penalty kicks.

SAFF U-15 Championship

References 

Asian women's national under-17 association football teams
 
Women's football in Bhutan